Travaris Jerod Robinson (born September 21, 1981) is an American football coach and former safety who is the cornerbacks coach at Alabama. He was the defensive backs coach at  University of Miami. He played college football at Auburn. Thereafter, he played professionally for the Atlanta Falcons and the Tampa Bay Buccaneers of the NFL.

Early years 
Robinson was born in Miami, Florida. At Coral Park High School in Miami, he played football for four years and earned all-state honors as a defensive back and wide receiver.

College playing career 
At Auburn University, Robinson played for the Auburn Tigers under head coach Tommy Tuberville from 1999 to 2002. As a freshman in 1999, Robinson was a wide receiver and kick returner, with 18 receptions for 174 yards and a touchdown and a team-leading 316 kick return yards.

Robinson moved from wide receiver to defensive back in 2000 while remaining at kick returner. Playing in all 13 games, Robinson had 30 tackles, 10 kickoff returns for 164 yards, two passes deflected, and one interception in a season where Auburn won the Southeastern Conference (SEC) West Division.

In 2001, Robinson played in 11 games on special teams and at cornerback, totaling 27 tackles and three pass deflections. For the second straight year, Robinson was on an Auburn team that won at least a share of the SEC West.

As a senior in 2002, Robinson was a starting free safety and had 92 total tackles, the second most on the team, and four interceptions. Robinson made the all-SEC first team in 2002.

Robinson graduated from Auburn in 2007 with a bachelor's degree in mass communications.

NFL career
Following the 2003 NFL Draft, Robinson signed with the Atlanta Falcons as an undrafted free agent. As a rookie with the Falcons, Robinson played in five games with one start, making 10 tackles, one pass defended, and one forced fumble.

The Falcons waived Robinson on October 8, 2003, after which the Tampa Bay Buccaneers immediately signed him off waivers. With the Buccaneers, Robinson played in four games with one start, making four tackles, one interception, and one pass defended. Robinson returned to the Falcons on July 30, 2004 after being waived by the Buccaneers. Prior to the regular season, the Falcons waived Robinson on August 31, 2004.

Coaching career

Early coaching career
Robinson began his coaching career in 2006 at Auburn under head coach Tommy Tuberville and defensive coordinator Will Muschamp as a defensive graduate assistant and staff assistant.  He helped Auburn win back-to-back bowl games, the 2007 Cotton Bowl Classic following the 2006 season and 2007 Chick-fil-A Bowl following the 2007 season.

After two seasons at Auburn, Robinson took his first full-time position with Western Kentucky for one season before becoming cornerbacks coach at Southern Miss in 2009.  His former college head coach, Tommy Tuberville, hired Robinson to serve as defensive backs coach at Texas Tech in 2010.

Florida
On January 2, 2011, the Florida Gators' new head coach, Will Muschamp, announced the hiring of Robinson as the Gators' defensive backs coach. During that time period, Florida played in two bowl games, including a win in the 2011 TicketCity Bowl.

Auburn (second stint)
On January 3, 2015, Robinson returned to Auburn, this time as cornerbacks coach.

South Carolina
On December 6, 2015, Robinson was hired as defensive coordinator at South Carolina, following Muschamp's appointment as head coach. The 2017 South Carolina team won the Outback Bowl. However, a lack of subsequent success led South Carolina to fire Muschamp in November 2020 seven games into the season.  On December 6, 2020, exactly 5 years after his hiring at UofSC, it was reported that new head coach Shane Beamer will not retain Robinson for the 2021 season. 

Robinson played a role in the development of several now-NFL defensive backs, including 2021 first round pick Jaycee Horn.

Miami
On January 9, 2021, he was hired as the defensive backs coach at the University of Miami.

Alabama
On January 19, 2022, rumors began to surface that Robinson was taking a position on Nick Saban’s staff at the University of Alabama.  On January 21, 2022, Robinson confirmed joining the Alabama staff as DB coach on his Twitter account.

References

External links 
 
 South Carolina biography
Texas Tech biography
Auburn coaching biography

1981 births
Living people
American football safeties
Atlanta Falcons players
Auburn Tigers football coaches
Auburn Tigers football players
Florida Gators football coaches
Miami Hurricanes football coaches
South Carolina Gamecocks football coaches
Miami Coral Park Senior High School alumni
Southern Miss Golden Eagles football coaches
Tampa Bay Buccaneers players
Texas Tech Red Raiders football coaches
Western Kentucky Hilltoppers football coaches
Players of American football from Miami
American football cornerbacks
American football wide receivers
American football return specialists
Coaches of American football from Florida
Sports coaches from Miami